Vitaly Vasilyevich Margelov (1 December 1941 – 22 March 2021) was a Russian politician and soldier. He was the son of General Vasily Margelov, a Hero of the Soviet Union and commander of the Soviet Airborne Forces.

Margelov joined the intelligence services in 1965. In the 1980s, he was the head of the 5th department of the First Chief Directorate of the KGB, which worked in Western Europe and the Balkans. He was deputy director for operations of the Foreign Intelligence Service between 1997 and 2003. In his service in the Russian intelligence apparatus (first the KGB, then the FIS) he has reached the rank of Colonel General before retiring in 2003. From 2003 to 2007, Margelov was a member of the State Duma, during its 4th convocation. He was a member of United Russia.

Margelov died on 22 March 2021, from COVID-19 in Moscow at the age of 79. He was buried in the Troyekurovskoye Cemetery on 27 March. His son is the public figure and politician Mikhail Margelov.

References

1941 births
2021 deaths
Fourth convocation members of the State Duma (Russian Federation)
Deaths from the COVID-19 pandemic in Russia
21st-century Russian politicians
United Russia politicians
Russian colonel generals
Recipients of the Order of Military Merit (Russia)
Recipients of the Order of Honour (Russia)
KGB officers
Russian spies
Soviet spies
Communist Party of the Soviet Union members
Moscow State University alumni
Burials in Troyekurovskoye Cemetery